The South Anna River is a principal tributary of the Pamunkey River, about  long, in central Virginia in the United States.  Via the Pamunkey and York rivers, it is part of the watershed of Chesapeake Bay.

According to the Geographic Names Information System, it has also been known as the Anna River.

Course
The South Anna River rises near Gordonsville in southwestern Orange County and flows generally southeastwardly and eastwardly through Louisa and Hanover counties.

Near its mouth the river collects the Newfound River.

See also
List of Virginia rivers

References

Columbia Gazetteer of North America entry
DeLorme (2005).  Virginia Atlas & Gazetteer.  Yarmouth, Maine: DeLorme.  .

Rivers of Virginia
Tributaries of the York River (Virginia)
Rivers of Hanover County, Virginia
Rivers of Louisa County, Virginia
Rivers of Orange County, Virginia
Rivers of Richmond, Virginia